Presbytini is a tribe of Old World monkeys that includes all of the Asian colobine monkeys.

Classification 

 Family Cercopithecidae
 Subfamily Cercopithecinae
 Subfamily Colobinae
 Tribe Colobini
 Tribe Presbytini
 Langur (leaf monkey) group
 Genus Trachypithecus - lutungs
 Genus Presbytis - surilis
 Genus Semnopithecus - gray langurs
 Odd-nosed group
 Genus Pygathrix - doucs
 Genus Rhinopithecus - snub-nosed monkeys
 Genus Nasalis - proboscis monkey
 Genus Simias - pig-tailed langur
 Genus Mesopithecus

References 

 
Mammal tribes
Taxa described in 1825
Taxa named by John Edward Gray